Doin' It is a song released by English-Irish pop group Liberty. Released on 3 December 2001, the song reached number 14 on the UK Singles Chart. The song was produced by Martin Hart from the MSain studios and was co-written by band members Tony Lundon, Kevin Simm, Jessica Taylor, Kelli Young.

Track listings
UK CD1
 "Doin' It"
 "Right Here Right Now"
 "Never Meant to Say Goodbye"

UK CD2
 "Doin' It"
 "Doin' It" (Kool De Sac Klub Mix edit)
 "Doin' It" (The Wideboys Radio Mix)
 "Doin' It" (Sleazesisters Anthem Mix edit)
 "Doin' It" (video)

UK cassette single
 "Doin' It"
 "Meant to Be"

Charts

References

2001 singles
2001 songs
Liberty X songs
Songs written by Kevin Simm
V2 Records singles